Salomón Asumu Obama Ondo (born 4 February 2000) is an Equatorial Guinean professional footballer who plays as a forward for Cypriot club Ethnikos Achna FC and the Equatorial Guinea national team.

Professional career
Obama moved to Spain at a young age from Equatorial Guinea, and raised in Torrejón. Salómón joined the youth academy of Atlético Madrid in 2008.

On 31 January 2019, Obama signed for Celta de Vigo, from Atletico Madrid.

International career
Obama, at the age of 18, was called up to the senior Equatorial Guinea national football team in August 2018. He previously played for the Spain under-17 team as he also holds Spanish citizenship.

He made his national team debut as a substitute against Sudan in the 2019 Africa Cup of Nations qualification.

International goals
Scores and results list Equatorial Guinea's goal tally first.

Personal life
Obama's twin brother, Federico Obama, is also a footballer for Atlético Madrid (at youth level) and a senior international for Equatorial Guinea.

References

External links
Atlético Madrid profile 

2000 births
Living people
Sportspeople from Malabo
Equatoguinean footballers
Association football forwards
Dibba FC players
Sevan FC players
UE Santa Coloma players
Ethnikos Achna FC players
Armenian First League players
Primera Divisió players
Equatorial Guinea international footballers
Equatoguinean expatriate footballers
Equatoguinean expatriate sportspeople in the United Arab Emirates
Expatriate footballers in the United Arab Emirates
Equatoguinean expatriate sportspeople in Armenia
Expatriate footballers in Armenia
Equatoguinean expatriate sportspeople in Andorra
Expatriate footballers in Andorra
Equatoguinean expatriate sportspeople in Cyprus
Expatriate footballers in Cyprus
Fang people
Twin sportspeople
Equatoguinean twins
Equatoguinean emigrants to Spain
Naturalised citizens of Spain
Footballers from the Community of Madrid
Spanish footballers
Atlético Madrid B players
Celta de Vigo B players
Mérida AD players
CD Móstoles URJC players
Segunda División B players
Spain youth international footballers
Spanish expatriate footballers
Spanish expatriate sportspeople in the United Arab Emirates
Spanish expatriate sportspeople in Armenia
Spanish expatriate sportspeople in Andorra
Spanish expatriate sportspeople in Cyprus
Spanish twins